Pearce Lane (October 9, 1930 – July 27, 2018) was an American boxer. He competed in the men's welterweight event at the 1956 Summer Olympics.

References

1930 births
2018 deaths
Welterweight boxers
American male boxers
Olympic boxers of the United States
Boxers at the 1956 Summer Olympics
People from Big Rapids, Michigan
Boxers from Michigan